Lygosoma bampfyldei, commonly known as Bampfylde's supple skink or Bampfylde's writhing skink, is a species of lizard in the family Scincidae. The species is endemic to Malaysia.

Etymology
The specific name, bampfyldei, is in honor of Charles Agar Bampfylde (1856–1918), who was head of government of the Raj of Sarawak (1896–1903).

Geographic range
L. bampfyldei is found in eastern Malaysia (Sabah and Sarawak).

Habitat
The preferred natural habitat of L. bampfyldei is lowland forest.

References

Further reading
Bartlett E (1895). "The Crocodiles and Lizards of Borneo in the Sarawak Museum, with Descriptions of Supposed New Species, and the Variation of Colours in the Several Species During Life". Journal of the Straits Branch of the Royal Asiatic Society 28: 73–96. (Lygosoma bampfyldei, new species, p. 96).
Grismer LL, Quah ESH, Duzulkafly Z, Yambun P (2018). "On the taxonomy of Lygosoma bampfyldei Bartlett, 1895 (Squamata: Scincidae) with descriptions of new species from Borneo and Peninsular Malaysia and the resurrection of Lygosoma schneideri Werner, 1900". Zootaxa 4438 (3): 528–550.

Lygosoma
Reptiles described in 1895
Taxa named by Edward Bartlett
Reptiles of Borneo